Hypatima nigrogrisea is a moth in the family Gelechiidae. It was described by Anthonie Johannes Theodorus Janse in 1949. It is found in South Africa (KwaZulu-Natal, North-West Province) and Zimbabwe.

References

Hypatima
Moths described in 1949